Explicator may refer to:
something or someone that explicates
Explicator verb
The Explicator, a journal of literary criticism